George Akosa is a Ghanaian politician, a member of the first Parliament of the fourth Republic representing the Mampong constituency in the Ashanti region.

Early life and education
George was born at Mampong in the Ashanti Region of Ghana.

Politics
George was elected into parliament on the ticket of the National Democratic Congress (NDC) during the December 1992 Ghanaian parliamentary election for the Mampong Constituency in the Ashanti Region of Ghana. As the only contesting parliamentary candidate for the constituency, he polled 6,166 votes which represented 100% valid votes cast. He lost to Elizabeth Nicol in the 1996 NDC Parliamentary Primaries.

Personal life
George Akosa is a Christian.

References

Living people
National Democratic Congress (Ghana) politicians
Ghanaian MPs 1993–1997
People from Ashanti Region
Ghanaian Christians
21st-century Ghanaian politicians
Year of birth missing (living people)